The Vandellòs Nuclear Power Plant is a nuclear power plant in Vandellòs located close to the Coll de Balaguer pass (Baix Camp comarca) in Catalonia, Spain.

Unit one was a 508 MWe carbon dioxide gas cooled reactor modeled on the UNGG reactor at the Saint Laurent Nuclear Power Plant in France.  It was shut down on July 31, 1990, following an accident that damaged one of its two turbogenerators on 19 October 1989. Important nuclear safety functions in the plant were impaired by the fire, and the event was later classified as a level 3 event in the International Nuclear Event Scale.

Unit two is a 1087 MWe PWR. The station's owners are: 72% Endesa and 28% Iberdrola.

See also

Nuclear power in Spain

References

External links

 Nuclear Power Plants - Spain at the Nuclear Tourist website.
 NEA Profile - Spain.
  INES International Nuclear Event Scale.
 Vandellos 1 NPP dismantling at the level 1 (PDF, 503KB).
 
 

Nuclear power stations in Catalonia
Nuclear power stations using pressurized water reactors
Graphite moderated reactors
Civilian nuclear power accidents
Energy infrastructure completed in 1972